Prince Frederick Charles Augustus of Württemberg (21 February 1808 – 9 May 1870) was a General in the Army of Württemberg and the father of William II of Württemberg. Frederick was a member of the Royal Family of Württemberg and a Prince of Württemberg.

Family
Frederick was born 21 February 1808 at Schloss Comburg (now part of Schwäbisch Hall), Kingdom of Württemberg, 
the second child and eldest son of Prince Paul of Württemberg and his wife Princess Charlotte of Saxe-Hildburghausen. Through his father, Frederick was a grandson of Frederick I of Württemberg and through his mother, a grandson of Frederick, Duke of Saxe-Altenburg. He was a younger brother of Grand Duchess Elena Pavlovna of Russia and an elder brother of Pauline, Duchess of Nassau and Prince August of Württemberg.

Military career
Frederick began his military career in the Army of Württemberg where by the age of 15, he had reached the rank of Rittmeister 2nd class. In 1832, he was a Colonel of the Infantry and by 1841, Frederick had attained the rank of Lieutenant General of the Cavalry. In 1865, Frederick was promoted by Charles I of Württemberg to General Commander of the Cavalry and the Württemberg Federal Army Corps. In the Austro-Prussian War against Prussia, Frederick held no field command, but instead served as a liaison officer at the headquarters of the Austrian Feldzeugmeister. Despite his serious eye problems, Frederick was offended when he was not offered the command of the Eighth Army Corps during the war.

Political career
Because of his position as a Prince of Württemberg, Frederick held a served as a member of the Württembergian Chamber of Lords at which he regularly attended legislative sessions. In 1865, Charles appointed Frederick as a privy councillor in the Geheimer Rat.
During this time, Frederick resided mainly at Ludwigsburg Palace near Stuttgart and at the hunting lodge Schloss Katharinenhof in Oppenweiler.

Marriage and issue
Frederick married his first cousin Princess Catherine of Württemberg, daughter of William I of Württemberg and his wife Pauline Therese of Württemberg, on 20 November 1845 in Stuttgart, Kingdom of Württemberg. Frederick and Catherine had one son:

William II of Württemberg (25 February 1848 – 2 October 1921)

Later life and death
Frederick died on 9 May 1870 in Stuttgart, Kingdom of Württemberg of an ulceration, which was most likely a later consequence of a facial injury he sustained in a hunting accident. Sophie, Queen of the Netherlands wrote of her cousin Frederick to Lady Malet upon learning of his death. According to Sophie, Frederick died after having suffered "cancer in the face" for eight years. Frederick was interred in the family crypt in the Schlosskirche at Ludwigsburg Palace.

Honours
 :
 Grand Cross of the Württemberg Crown, 1822
 Grand Cross of the Friedrich Order
 : Knight of St. Hubert, 1830
 : Knight of the Rue Crown, 1834
    Ernestine duchies: Grand Cross of the Saxe-Ernestine House Order, February 1837
 :
 Knight of the House Order of Fidelity, 1845
 Grand Cross of the Zähringer Lion, 1845 
 : Grand Cross of the Order of Duke Peter Friedrich Ludwig, with Golden Crown, 17 October 1853
 : Knight of St. George, 1855
 : Knight of the Gold Lion of Nassau, November 1858

Ancestry

References

1808 births
1870 deaths
People from Schwäbisch Hall
German Protestants
People from the Kingdom of Württemberg
Princes of Württemberg
Members of the Württembergian Chamber of Lords
Generals of Cavalry of Württemberg
Members of the Privy Council of Württemberg
People of the Austro-Prussian War
Military personnel from Baden-Württemberg
Non-inheriting heirs presumptive